Hape is a surname. Notable people with the surname include:

Hape (tohunga), Polynesian navigator
Janis Hape (born 1958), American swimmer
Patrick Hape (born 1974), American football player
Shontayne Hape (born 1981), New Zealand rugby league and union player

See also
R. v. Hape, Supreme Court of Canada case
High-altitude pulmonary edema, HAPE